Younger Ikavian, also called Western Ikavian/Western Neoshtokavian Ikavian and Bosnian–Dalmatian dialect, is a subdialect of Shtokavian Serbo-Croatian spoken in Croatia in the Dalmatian Hinterland, in Bosnia and Herzegovina west of the river Bosna and Neretva, and in the Bácska region of Hungary (inc. Budapest) and the autonomous province Vojvodina of Serbia. Most speakers use the Latin alphabet.

There are also isolated pockets where this dialect is spoken – small area south of Novi Vinodolski, Lika hinterland, the southern Croatian islands of Šolta, Brač, Hvar and Korčula and in central Slavonia.

It is further divided into Ikavian Schakavian (Šćakavian; from ) and Ikavian Shtakavian (Štakavian; from ).

Since 2021, Croatia cathagorized the Neo-Shtokavian–Younger Ikavian dialect to be Bunjevac dialect with three sub-branches: Dalmatian (also called Bosnian-Dalmatian), Danubian (also called Bunjevac), and Littoral-Lika.

Footnotes

Bibliography 

 
 
 
 

Croatian language
Dialects of Serbo-Croatian